Andrea Amici (born 19 October 1971) is an Italian male retired sprinter, which participated, with Italian national track relay team at two editions of the World Championships in Athletics (1993 and 1997).

Achievements

National titles
He won two times the national championships at senior level.
Italian Athletics Indoor Championships
60 metres: 1991, 1993

References

External links
 

1971 births
Living people
Italian male sprinters
World Athletics Championships athletes for Italy
Athletics competitors of Centro Sportivo Carabinieri
Athletes (track and field) at the 1993 Mediterranean Games
Mediterranean Games competitors for Italy
20th-century Italian people